The Name Is Love is American singer Bobby Vinton's thirtieth studio album and his final for ABC Records. Unlike most of his albums (which consisted of only one or two of his own compositions), the majority of the material on this album was written or co-written by Vinton himself. Cover versions include "Hold Me, Thrill Me, Kiss Me" and "Only Love Can Break a Heart" (the former a hit for Mel Carter in 1965 and the latter a hit for Gene Pitney in 1962). The song "You Are Love" did not become a hit until six years later.

This album is notable in that country singer Janie Fricke performs the backing vocals. Three singles were released from the album – "Hold Me Thrill Me Kiss Me", "Only Love Can Break A Heart", and "All My Today's".

Track listing
All tracks composed by Bobby Vinton; except where indicated

Side A
 "Love Makes Everything Better" - 2:40
 "I Remember Loving You" - 3:24
 "Hold Me, Thrill Me, Kiss Me" - (Harry Noble) - 2:47
 "Her Name Is Love" - (Gary Knight, Gene Allan, Bobby Vinton) - 2:26
 "Only Love Can Break a Heart" - (Burt Bacharach, Hal David) - 2:57
 "You Are Love" - 2:27

Side B
 "All My Today's" - 3:06
 "Once More With Feeling" - 2:57
 "Baby, When It Comes to Loving You" - (D. "Scotty" Reed) - 2:23
 "Ain't That Lovin' You" - 3:13
 "Where Were You All of My Life" - (Bobby Vinton, Gene Allan) - 2:50

Album credits
Produced by Bob Morgan
Arrangements by Bobby Vinton, Charlie McCoy, Bob Morgan
String arrangements by Bill McElhiney, Bill Justis, Bergen White, Lee Holdridge
Vocal backgrounds: The Nashville Edition
Female vocals: Janie Fricke
Recording engineers: Lou Bradley, Ken Laxton, Ron Reynolds, Armin Steiner
Remix engineer: Ken Laxton
Cover photo: Eddy Sanderson
Back photo: Lloyd Morales
Photo tinting: Melanie Nissen

Charts
Album - Billboard (North America)

Singles - Billboard (North America)

1977 albums
Bobby Vinton albums
Albums arranged by Bill McElhiney
Albums arranged by Bill Justis
Albums arranged by Lee Holdridge
ABC Records albums